Lensky District (Lienskey uluuha) is an administrative and municipal district (raion, or ulus), one of the thirty-four in the Sakha Republic, Russia. It is located in the southwest of the republic and borders Mirninsky District in the north, Suntarsky District in the northeast, Olyokminsky District in the east, and Irkutsk Oblast in the south and west. Its administrative center is the town of Lensk. As of the 2010 Census, the total population of the district was 39,765, with the population of Lensk accounting for 62.8% of that number.

Geography 
The main river in the district is the Lena with its tributaries the Vitim, Peleduy, Derba and Nyuya.

Climate

History
The district was established on January 30, 1930.

Administrative and municipal status
Within the framework of administrative divisions, Lensky District is one of the thirty-four in the republic. It is divided into one town (an administrative division with the administrative center in the town (inhabited locality) of Lensk), two settlements (administrative divisions with the administrative centers in the urban-type settlements (inhabited localities) of Peleduy and Vitim), and eight rural okrugs (naslegs), all of which comprise sixteen rural localities. As a municipal division, the district is incorporated as Lensky Municipal District. Within the municipal district, the Town of Lensk is incorporated into Lensk Urban Settlement, the two settlements are incorporated into two urban settlements, and the eight rural okrugs are incorporated into eight rural settlements. The town of Lensk serves as the administrative center of both the administrative and municipal district.

Inhabited localities

Economy
The economy of the district is mostly based on timber industry, production of construction materials, and food industry.

Demographics 

As of the 1989 Census, the ethnic composition was as follows:
Russians: 76.9%
Yakuts: 8.7%
Evens: 0.1%
Evenks: 0.1%
other ethnicities: 14.2%

See also 
 Lena Plateau

References

Notes

Sources
Official website of the Sakha Republic. Registry of the Administrative-Territorial Divisions of the Sakha Republic. Lensky District. 

Districts of the Sakha Republic
States and territories established in 1930